Humanure is the second major label album by American deathgrind band Cattle Decapitation. It was released on July 13, 2004 through Metal Blade Records and has been noted for its iconic cover art, depicting a cow defecating what appears to be human body parts in a wasteland environment–the image  been compared to the artwork for Pink Floyd’s album Atom Heart Mother. Humanure generated some minor controversy around the time of release for its obscene imagery.

The album's opening track "Scatology Domine" (the title of which is a Pink Floyd reference, in this case to the song "Astronomy Domine") is a cover of the opening of Beethoven's Moonlight Sonata. Gabe Serbian, Justin Pearson, and Robert Bray of The Locust made guest appearances on the album, along with former member Scott Miller. A music video was produced for "Reduced to Paste".

Album art
The album cover, which has been compared to the cover for Pink Floyd’s album Atom Heart Mother, was drawn by artist Wes Benscoter. The cover depicting a cow defecating flesh and blood was deemed grotesque by most retailers, and they refused to carry it unless it was altered. Because of this, a reissue of Humanure was released by Metal Blade with the cow omitted, leaving just the barren wasteland visible.

In an interview with Revolver, Benscoter claimed that art's similarity to Pink Floyd's album was not intentional, and he did not even look at the artwork for Atom Heart Mother until the Humanure piece was already finished.

Critical reception

Exclaim! wrote: "These CA sickos have honed their death-grind skills down to perfection now; harnessing the early Carcass sound and adding in modern death metal ingredients, CD are one of the best doing this sound today." Orlando Weekly wrote that "Cattle Decapitation again provide a potent antidote to the prevalent knucklehead mindset that defines most metal."

Track listing

Personnel

Cattle Decapitation
Travis Ryan – vocals
Josh Elmore – guitar
Troy Oftedal – bass
Michael Laughlin – drums

Production
Bill Metoyer – engineering, mixing
Brad Vance – mastering

References

2004 albums
Cattle Decapitation albums
Albums with cover art by Wes Benscoter